Emperor Shenzong of Song (25 May 1048 – 1 April 1085), personal name Zhao Xu, was the sixth emperor of the Song dynasty of China. His original personal name was Zhao Zhongzhen but he changed it to "Zhao Xu" after his coronation. He reigned from 1067 until his death in 1085.

Reign

During his reign in 1068, Emperor Shenzong became interested in Wang Anshi's policies and appointed Wang as the Chancellor. Wang implemented his famous New Policies aimed at improving the situation for the peasantry and unemployed. These acts became the hallmark reform of Emperor Shenzong's reign.

Emperor Shenzong sent failed campaigns against the Vietnamese ruler Lý Nhân Tông of the Lý dynasty in 1076.

Emperor Shenzong's other notable act as emperor was his attempt to weaken the Tangut-led Western Xia state by invading and expelling the Western Xia forces from Qing prefecture (庆州, today Qingyang, Gansu Province). The Song army was initially quite successful at these campaigns, but during the battle for the city of Yongle (永乐城), in 1082, Song forces were defeated. As a result, Western Xia grew more powerful and subsequently continued to be a thorn in the side of the Song Empire over the ensuing decades.

Emperor Shenzong hired Muslim warriors from Bukhara to fight against Khitan Liao dynasty. 5,300 Muslim men from Bukhara were encouraged and invited to move to China in 1070 by the Song emperor Shenzong to help battle the Liao empire in the northeast and repopulate areas ravaged by fighting. The emperor hired these men as mercenaries in his campaign against the Liao empire. Later on these men were settled between the Song capital of Bianliang (today Kaifeng) and Yenching (modern Beijing). The circuits (道) of the north and north-east were settled in 1080 when 10,000 more Muslims were invited into China.

During Emperor Shenzong's reign, Sima Guang, a minister interested in the history of the previous 1000 years, wrote a very influential history book, the Zizhi Tongjian or A Comprehensive Mirror for Aid in Government. This book records historical events from the Zhou dynasty to the Song dynasty. Another notable literary achievement which occurred during his reign was the compilation of the Seven Military Classics, including the alleged forgery of the Questions and Replies between Tang Taizong and Li Weigong.

Aside from the ancient Roman embassies to Han and Three-Kingdoms era China, contact with Europe remained sparse if not nonexistent before the 13th century. However, from Chinese records it is known that Michael VII Doukas (Mie li yi ling kai sa 滅力伊靈改撒) of Fo lin (i.e. the Byzantine Empire) dispatched a diplomatic mission to China's Song dynasty that arrived in 1081, during the reign of Emperor Shenzong.

Emperor Shenzong died in 1085 at the age of 36 from an unspecified illness and was succeeded by his son, Zhao Xu who took the throne as Emperor Zhezong. Emperor Zhezong was underage and so Shenzong’s mother Empress Gao ruled as regent until her death.

Family
Consorts and Issue:
 Empress Qinsheng, of the Xiang clan (1046–1101)
 Princess Shuhuai (1067–1078), first daughter
 Empress Qincheng, of the Zhu clan (1052–1102)
 Zhao Xu, Zhezong (1077–1100), sixth son
 Zhao Shi, Prince Churongxian (1083–1106), 13th son
 Princess Xianjing (1085–1115)
 Married Pan Yi in 1104, and had issue (two sons)
 Empress Qinci, of the Chen clan (1058–1089)
 Zhao Ji, Huizong (1082–1135), 11th son
 Noble Consort, of the Xing clan (d. 1103)
 Zhao Jin, Prince Hui (1071), second son
 Zhao Xian, Prince Ji (1074–1076), fifth son
 Zhao Jia, Prince Yudaohui (1077–1078), seventh son
 Zhao Ti, Prince Xuchonghui (1078–1081), eighth son
 Noble Consort, of the Yang clan
 Noble Consort, of the Song clan (d. 1117)
 Zhao Yi, Prince Cheng (1069), first son
 Zhao Jun, Prince Tang'aixian (1073–1077), third son
 Princess Xianxiao (d. 1108), fourth daughter
 Married Wang Yu in 1097
 Pure Consort, of the Zhang clan (d. 1105)
 Princess Xianke (d. 1072), second daughter
 Virtuous Consort, of the Zhu clan
 Princess Xianmu (d. 1084)
 Worthy Consort, of the Wu clan (d. 1107)
 Zhao Bi, Prince Wurongmu (1082–1106), ninth son
 Princess Xianhe (d. 1090)
 Worthy Consort, of the Lin clan (1052–1090), personal name Zhen
 Zhao Yu, Prince Yan (1083–1127), 12th son
 Princess Xianling (d. 1084)
 Zhao Cai, Prince Yue (1085–1129), 14th son
 Cairen, of the Guo clan
 Zhao Wei, Prince Yi (1082), tenth son
 Furen, of the Xiang clan
 Zhao Shen, Prince Bao (1074), fourth son
 Unknown
 Princess Xianmu (d. 1111), third daughter
 Married Han Jiayan (d. 1129)
 Princess Xiankang (d. 1085)
 Princess Xianyi (d. 1085)

Ancestry

See also
Chinese emperors family tree (middle)
List of emperors of the Song dynasty
Architecture of the Song dynasty
Culture of the Song dynasty
Economy of the Song dynasty
History of the Song dynasty
Society of the Song dynasty
Technology of the Song dynasty
Wang Anshi
Shen Kuo

References 

1048 births
1085 deaths
Northern Song emperors
11th-century Chinese monarchs
People from Kaifeng
Chinese reformers